Xenosaga: Pied Piper is a 2004 role-playing video game co-developed by Monolith Soft, Namco, and Tom Create. The game was published by Namco in 2004 for mobile devices. A spin-off of the Xenosaga trilogy and forming part of the Xeno metaseries, the storyline follows the human life of cyborg Ziggurat 8—a key character in the Xenosaga trilogy—a century before the events of Xenosaga Episode I. Gameplay follows a similar system to the mainline Xenosaga games but adjusted for mobile devices.

The storyline of Pied Piper was planned from an early stage, and was incorporated as a mobile title after Monolith Soft was approached by Namco's mobile division. The storyline was written by series creators Tetsuya Takahashi and Soraya Saga; Pied Piper would be Saga's last project for the Xenosaga series. The game's title is a reference to the German legend of the Pied Piper of Hamelin. Originally released through Vodafone Live, it would later be released through NTT DoCoMo's i-mode.

Gameplay

Similar to the rest of the Xenosaga series, Xenosaga: Pied Piper is a role-playing video game in which the player controls a party of characters to progress through environments linked to the main narrative. The player, taking the role of main protagonist Jan Sauer, explores environments from a 2D overhead perspective, with a combination of conversations and cinematic cutscenes advancing the narrative; battles take place in a virtual space tied to the story. Enemies encountered during exploration are fought using a turn-based battle system carrying over mechanics from Xenosaga Episode I; characters can save "Boost" points to interrupt an enemy's turn to perform an early action. Each character has specific actions they are specialized at, such as Jan being skilled with knife-based attacks. Actions include standard attacks and special attacks triggered using points accumulated by death blows dealt to enemies in previous battles.

Synopsis
Pied Piper is set a century before the events of Xenosaga Episode I; taking place 4000 years in the future, humanity has left Earth and established civilization in another part of the Milky Way galaxy under the rule of the Galaxy Federation. The story follows Federal Police Special Operations member Jan Sauer investigating a series of terrorist attacks on the Federation's hyperspace transport network U.M.N.. The man behind the terrorist attacks is a mysterious figure called Voyager, whose U.M.N.-based crimes are accompanied by cruel attacks on civilian women and children. As he continues to investigate, Jan is forced to navigate sensitive political negotiations between the Federation and the Immigrant Fleet theocracy, who worship an ancient artifact called the Zohar. Jan's investigations reveal Voyager's identity as Erich Webster, a member of their team whose addiction to information led him to become what he is in search of the god-like entity U-DO. On the point of death after his Congress contact Dmitri Yuriev stops providing him with the drugs necessary to counter U-DO's influence, Erich manipulates the Immigrant Fleet to communicate with U-DO through the Zohar. Rejected by U-DO, he is instead granted a new life as a being called a Testament by Wilhelm, immortal CEO of Vector Industries. Having killed everyone close to Jan including his wife and son, Voyager asks him to choose between eternal life as a Testament or being killed by him; Jan instead shoots himself. Jan is later resurrected as the cyborg Ziggurat 8, playing a key role in the events of the Xenosaga trilogy. Ziggurat 8's history with Voyager is alluded to when the characters cross paths throughout the series, but it is not explained fully until Xenosaga Episode III, which includes an extensive plot summary of Pied Piper and major character profiles.

Development and release
The story of Ziggy was always part of series creator Tetsuya Takahashi's plan for the Xenosaga project, but Monolith Soft had yet to decide in what form it should be presented. Takahashi later stated that Ziggy's story was originally part of the planned scenario for Xenosaga Episode II. The team were then contacted by the mobile development division of series publisher Namco, asking whether Monolith Soft could work with them on a mobile property. The team decided to use the mobile game to communicate Ziggy's story and agreed to the collaboration. Namco Mobile developed the game, while Monolith Soft handled the story development. External studio Tom Create helped develop the game. The creation of Pied Piper formed part of a move by the newly-established lead developers of Xenosaga to expand the series into other media following the release of Episode I. The game's script was co-written by series creators Tetsuya Takahashi and his wife Soraya Saga. Pied Piper was Saga's last contribution to the Xenosaga series prior to leaving the project in 2005. The game's title is a reference to the German fable of the Pied Piper of Hamelin. Pied Piper was first announced in July 2004. The game was originally published exclusively for Vodafone devices, a version was released on 5 July 2006 for NTT DoCoMo's i-mode service. The third video game release in the Xenosaga series, the game is one of two games to remain exclusive to Japan.

Notes

References

External links
   (archived October 2005)

2004 video games
Japan-exclusive video games
Mobile games
Role-playing video games
Video game prequels
Video games about police officers
Video games developed in Japan
Pied Piper